NHL Rock the Rink is a video game developed by EA Canada and published by Electronic Arts for the PlayStation in 2000.

Reception

The game received "favorable" reviews according to the review aggregation website GameRankings. Jeff Lundrigan of NextGen said it was "One of the rare 'extreme' sports parodies that offers as much depth as laughs."

Rosters

References

External links
 

2000 video games
EA Sports games
National Hockey League video games
PlayStation (console) games
PlayStation (console)-only games
Video games developed in Canada